Yevgeny Vladimirovich Morozov (born 14 February 2001) is a Russian football player. He plays for FC Fakel Voronezh on loan from FC Lokomotiv Moscow.

Club career
He made his debut in the Russian Football National League for FC Volgar Astrakhan on 6 March 2022 in a game against FC Yenisey Krasnoyarsk.

On 27 May 2022, Morozov joined FC Fakel Voronezh on loan for the 2022–23 season. He made his Russian Premier League debut for Fakel on 12 August 2022 against FC Ural Yekaterinburg.

Career statistics

References

External links
 
 
 
 Profile by Russian Football National League

2001 births
Footballers from Moscow
Living people
Russian footballers
Association football defenders
FC Lokomotiv Moscow players
FC Volgar Astrakhan players
FC Fakel Voronezh players
Russian Second League players
Russian First League players
Russian Premier League players